The total number of distinct Egyptian hieroglyphs increased over time from several hundred in the Middle Kingdom to several thousand during the Ptolemaic Kingdom.

In 1928/1929 Alan Gardiner published an overview of hieroglyphs, Gardiner's sign list, the basic modern standard. It describes 763 signs in 26 categories (A–Z, roughly). Georg Möller compiled more extensive lists, organized by historical epoch (published posthumously in 1927 and 1936).

In Unicode, the block Egyptian Hieroglyphs (2009) includes 1071 signs, organization based on Gardiner's list. As of 2016, there is a proposal by Michael Everson to extend the Unicode standard to comprise Möller's list.

Subsets
Notable subsets of hieroglyphs:
 Determinatives
 Uniliteral signs
 Biliteral signs
 Triliteral signs
 Egyptian numerals

Letter classification by Gardiner

List of hieroglyphs

In Unicode

Unicode character names follow Gardiner's sign list (padded with zeroes to three digits, i.e. Gardiner "A1" is "EGYPTIAN HIEROGLYPH A001"), with the addition of glyph names in NL001–NL020 and NU001–NU022, representing the 20 Nomes of Lower Egypt and the 22 Nomes of Upper Egypt, respectively.

Articles on individual hieroglyphs

 Arm, cubit symbol (hieroglyph)
 Bee (hieroglyph)
 Bone-with-meat (hieroglyph)
 Bowstring (hieroglyph)
 Brazier (hieroglyph)
 Bull (ka hieroglyph)
 Carob (hieroglyph)
 Child (hieroglyph)
 Cross-ndj (hieroglyph)
 Crossroads (hieroglyph)
 Djsr (arm with powerstick)
 Egg (hieroglyph)
 Emblem of the East (hieroglyph)
 Emblem of the West (hieroglyph)
 Face (hieroglyph)
 Foot (hieroglyph)
 Foreleg of ox
 Game piece (hieroglyph)
 Gold (hieroglyph)
 Grape arbor (hieroglyph)
 Hand (hieroglyph)
 Hand drill (hieroglyph)
 Hare (hieroglyph)
 Harpoon (hieroglyph)
 Hill-country (hieroglyph)
 House (hieroglyph)

 Incense burner: arm (hieroglyph)
 Incense burner: pot (hieroglyph)
 Jubilee Pavilion (hieroglyph)
 Km (hieroglyph)
 Land, irrigated (hieroglyph)
 Leopard head (hieroglyph)
 Man-prisoner (hieroglyph)
 Man-seated: arms in adoration (hieroglyph)
 Mast (hieroglyph)
 Night (hieroglyph)
 Naos (hieroglyph)
 Papyrus stem (hieroglyph)
 Pick (hieroglyph)
 Pr (hieroglyph)
 Road (hieroglyph)
 Sail (hieroglyph)
 Shuti hieroglyph (two-feather adornment)
 Sky (hieroglyph)
 Spine with fluid (hieroglyph)
 Stair-single (hieroglyph)
 Sun (hieroglyph)
 Sun-rising (hieroglyph)
 Swallow (hieroglyph)
 Three fox skins (hieroglyph)
 Throw stick (hieroglyph)
 Two whips with shen ring (hieroglyph)
 Union symbol (hieroglyph)

Hieroglyph is part of article
Ankh
Bennu
Cartouche
Deshret
Djed
Eye of Horus
Hedjet
Khepresh
Renpet
Sekhem scepter
Serekh
Seshat's emblem
Set animal
Shen ring
Tyet
Uraeus
Wadjet
Was (sceptre)

See also
Egyptian hieroglyphs
Gardiner's sign list
List of cuneiform signs

References

 Budge, Sir E.A.Wallis,  An Egyptian Hieroglyphic Dictionary, in Two Volumes, Sir E.A.Wallis Budge, (Dover Publications, Inc. New York), c 1920, Dover Edition, c 1978.  (Large categorized listings of Hieroglyphs, Vol 1, pp. xcvii–cxlvii (97–147) (25 categories, 1000+ hieroglyphs), 50 pgs.)
Faulkner, William (1991). Middle Egyptian. Griffith. .:
 A.H. Gardiner, Catalogue of the Egyptian hieroglyphic printing type, from matrices owned and controlled by Dr. Alan  (1928).
 A.H. Gardiner, "Additions to the new hieroglyphic fount (1928)", The Journal of Egyptian Archaeology 15 (1929), p. 95.
 A.H. Gardiner, "Additions to the new hieroglyphic fount (1931)", The Journal of Egyptian Archaeology 17 (1931), pp. 245–247.
 A.H. Gardiner, Supplement to the catalogue of the Egyptian hieroglyphic printing type, showing acquisitions to December 1953  (1953).
 A.H. Gardiner, Egyptian Grammar: Being an Introduction to the Study of Hieroglyphs. 3rd Ed., pub. Griffith Institute, Oxford, 1957 (1st edition 1927), pp. 438–548 (pdf).
 Möller, Georg. 1909. Hieratische Paläographie: die aegyptische Buchschrift in ihrer Entwicklung von der Fünften Dynastie bis zur römischen Kaiserzeit. Erster Band: Bis zum Beginn der achtzehnten Dynastie
 Möller, Georg. 1927. Hieratische Paläographie: die aegyptische Buchschrift in ihrer Entwicklung von der Fünften Dynastie bis zur römischen Kaiserzeit. Zweiter Band: Von der Zeit Thutmosis' III bis zum Ende der einundzwanzigsten Dynastie,
 Möller, Georg. 1936. Hieratische Paläographie: die aegyptische Buchschrift in ihrer Entwicklung von der Fünften Dynastie bis zur römischen Kaiserzeit. Dritter Band: Von der zweiundzwanzigsten Dynastie bis zum dritten Jahrhundert nach Chr.
 Möller, Georg. 1936. Hieratische Paläographie: die aegyptische Buchschrift in ihrer Entwicklung von der Fünften Dynastie bis zur römischen Kaiserzeit. Vierter *Band: Ergänzungsheft zu Band I und II
 Wilkinson, Richard,  Reading Egyptian Art, A Hieroglyphic Guide to Ancient Egyptian Painting and Sculpture, Richard H. Wilkinson, with 450 Illustrations, (Thames & Hudson Ltd, London), c 1992.
 Rainer Hannig: Großes Handwörterbuch Ägyptisch-Deutsch. (2800 – 950 v. Chr.) Marburger Edition. 4th rev. ed. von Zabern, Mainz 2006, (= Hannig-Lexica. vol. 1); (= Kulturgeschichte der Antiken Welt. vol. 64, ISSN 0937-9746),contains the Gardiner list plus an extended sign list.
 Rainer Hannig, Petra Vomberg: Wortschatz der Pharaonen in Sachgruppen. Hannig Lexica vol. 2, 2nd ed, von Zabern, Mainz 2012, .
 Friedrich Junge: Einführung in die Grammatik des Neuägyptischen 3rd rev. ed. Harrassowitz, Wiesbaden 2008, information on transcription and transliteration and peculiarities of New Kingdom orthographies.
 Christian Leitz: Die Tempelinschriften der griechisch-römischen Zeit. 3rd rev ed.   Münster 2009, (= Quellentexte zur ägyptischen Religion 1), (= Einführungen und Quellentexte zur Ägyptologie 2), references older inventories of Ptolemaic era hieroglyphics.
 Michael Everson and Bob Richmond, Towards a Proposal to encode Egyptian Hieroglyphs in Unicode (2006)

External links

 WikiHiero syntax (MediaWiki)
 :wiktionary:Appendix:Unicode/Egyptian Hieroglyphs
 :wiktionary:Category:Egyptian hieroglyphic script characters
 Gardiner Sign List
 Alphabet at ancient-egypt.co.uk
 Pharaoh's names
 finding hieroglyphs

+